is Bonnie Pink's nineteenth single from the album Just a Girl. The single was released under the East West Japan label on August 21, 2001.

Track listing

"That's Just What You Are"

Oricon Sales Chart

2001 singles
2001 songs
Bonnie Pink songs